Brandon Whipple (born July 13, 1982) is an American politician and academic serving as mayor of Wichita, Kansas. He previously served as a Democratic member of the Kansas House of Representatives representing the 96th district, which included part of south Wichita and was the Ranking Minority member on the Higher Education Budget committee.

When the Kansas Legislature was not in session, Whipple served as an adjunct professor of American politics at Wichita State University, his alma mater. Whipple defeated incumbent Jeff Longwell in the 2019 Wichita mayoral election.

Early life and education

Whipple was raised in Dover, New Hampshire. He earned his Associate of Arts in liberal studies from New Hampshire's Hesser College in 2003. He moved to Wichita, Kansas, at age 21 in a year-long education-service mission with AmeriCorps, working with at-risk youth at Wichita South High School. While there, he discovered he could afford to attend Wichita State University (WSU). He graduated from WSU with a bachelor's degree in sociology and a minor in psychology; later at WSU, he earned a master’s degree in liberal studies, with an emphasis on cross-cultural studies and public administration. While at Wichita State, Whipple was a student senator in WSU's Student Government Association, an experience he credits as decisive in his later entry into the Kansas legislature (particularly a trip to the state capitol to lobby for student issues).

Whipple later acquired a Doctor of Arts in leadership studies from Franklin Pierce University, a private college in New Hampshire.

Career 
Subsequently, while serving in the Kansas Legislature, Whipple also served as an adjunct instructor for various Wichita-area colleges and universities, including Wichita State University, Southwestern College and some commercial colleges—particularly teaching political science, history and sociology.

Kansas House of Representatives 
Whipple first ran for the Kansas House of Representatives in 2010 against Phil Hermanson. Whipple lost, but shortly afterward the Sedgwick County Democratic Party elected him its vice chair. In 2012, he was elected the county party's chair.

That same year, in a run for the Kansas House 96th District seat (in south Wichita), he was criticized by Tea Party Republican Craig Gable for not having children. Whipple defeated Republican Rick Lindsey. Whipple was re-elected to the seat in 2014, 2016 and 2018, in a district that voted for Donald Trump for president in 2016.

In 2016, Whipple was elected Agenda Chair for the Democrats in the Kansas House of Representatives—the #6 position in House Democratic party leadership. In 2018, he co-founded the bipartisan Kansas Future Caucus, a group of under-45 Kansas legislators, to focus attention on issues of concern to young people.

Among his principal efforts in office was increased funding for education, particularly restoration of funding cuts made during the administration of Kansas governor Sam Brownback.

In the 2019 Kansas Legislature, Whipple was Ranking minority member on the Joint Committee on Information Technology, and the Higher Education Budget Committee. He was also assigned to the Committee on Elections and the Joint Committee on Corrections and Juvenile Justice Oversight.

Committee assignments

2019–2020 session
Ranking Minority Member of Higher Education Budget
Ranking Minority Member of Joint Information Technology
Elections
Joint Corrections and Juvenile Justice

2017–2018 session
Ranking Minority Member of Commerce, Labor and Economic Development
Financial Institutions and Pensions
Higher Education Budget
Joint Information Technology

2015–2016 session
Utilities and Telecommications
Commerce, Labor and Economic Development
Taxation
House Select Investigating Committee
Telecommunications Study Committee
Joint Information Technology

2013–2014 session
Children and Seniors
Judiciary
Utilities and Telecommications
Commerce, Labor and Economic Development
Telecommunications Study Committee
Joint Information Technology

2019 Wichita mayoral race

Whipple ran in the 2019 election for mayor of Wichita. In the nonpartisan primary election, preliminary results put Whipple (with 5,729 votes; 25.9% of the total) second only to Republican Mayor Longwell (who had 7,136 votes; 32.3%).
 Candidate Lyndy Wells, also a Republican, had only 160 votes fewer in initial returns: 5,569 votes; 25.2%, so delayed acceptance of the result in hopes that a review of 1,000 yet-uncounted ballots (including 500 provisional ballots) might turn the election to his favor. The final count nearly doubled Whipple's lead over Wells, advancing Whipple and Longwell to the ballot for the November 5 runoff election. Wells mounted a write-in campaign.

In October 2019, Whipple found himself the victim of an elaborate, multi-state, covert smear campaign in which Republican state Representative Michael Capps was implicated as a perpetrator. After Sedgwick County, Kansas Republican party chair Dalton Glasscock called for Capps to resign, Capps claimed that Glasscock had actually approved the production of the ad, which Glasscock denied. Money raised for the production of the video was alleged to have been laundered through a charitable non-profit organization directed by Capps to conceal the identities of the alleged perpetrators.

Newly created anonymous entities also attacked both Whipple and Wells weighed via several mailers. Although the sending organizations used different names, they were all linked through a postal permit held by a Kansas City bulk-mail service. The funding of the salacious video as well as the anonymous mailers will not be required to be reported, according to the Kansas Governmental Ethics Commission. It has ruled outside organizations must report their identities and spending only if they use specific key terms such as "vote for," "elect," "vote against" or "defeat". The Democratic party was also criticized for publicly sending a mailer claiming that Longwell was being investigated by the District Attorney for "corruption". In fact, he had just been advised to report contributions and gifts received from the contractor to which a half-billion-dollar contract had been awarded.

On election day, November 5, 2019, Longwell conceded the election to Whipple, who won with 46% of the ballots versus 36% for Longwell, with the balance cast for write-in candidates which remained to be counted. The results were certified on November 15, 2019.

In October 2020, Whipple, represented by former U.S. Attorney Randy Rathbun, filed suit against Capps, Wichita City Councilman James Clendenin, and Sedgwick County Commissioner Michael O'Donnell, for defamation involving the false charges made against him in the 2019 mayoral election race. Allegations cited were that the co-conspirators tried to blame the conspiracy on Sedgwick Republican County Committee Chairman Dalton Glasscock, and that, with false accusations, they intended to generate marital discord within Whipple's own family. To conceal the donors and funding of the smear, monies were said to have been laundered through a 501(c)3 non-profit charity directed by Capps. The suit had originally been filed against the maker of the video, Matthew Colburn. It was dropped after Colburn provided audio, text messages, and other evidence, that had identified O'Donnell as the alleged leader of the conspiracy to defame Whipple. O'Donnell was accused of writing the script for the video frame-up, Whipple said that he felt sorry for the then-21-year-old Colburn who had been scapegoated by the actual perpetrators. On November 25, Marc Bennett, the Sedgwick County D.A., moved to have the state take up the case of the removal of Capps from office since the D.A. is precluded from doing so by statute in the case of a state legislator. He was proceeding to remove Clendenin from the City Council where he possessed such authority.

Tenure
On October 16, 2020, Meredith Dowty, a 59-year-old local musician and retired firefighter, was arrested on suspicion of threatening to kidnap and kill Whipple after he attempted to get his address from another city official. He was reportedly frustrated by the city's mask ordinance and other mitigation measures against the COVID-19 pandemic, which prevented him from seeing his mother. Whipple, who had been a target of local criticism for passing the ordinance, said he will increase security at his home in response to the alleged threat. Dowty could face a charge of criminal threat.

On September 24, 2022, Whipple was involved in a verbal altercation with a Wichita Police officer after being prevented from delivering trash to a community cleanup event. In video footage recorded by the officer's body-worn camera, Whipple calls City Manager Robert Layton to tell him the officer "doesn't know who I am," before requesting the name of the acting chief of police so that Whipple could file a complaint. Whipple released the footage himself on October 13th after learning the officer's body camera was not turned on for the beginning of the altercation, during which Whipple claimed the officer yelled at him. Whipple used the situation to call for a review of Wichita police body-camera policies, but ultimately apologized for his role in the event.

Personal life
Whipple is married to Chelsea (Grady) Whipple, also a Wichita State University graduate. The two are members of the Episcopal Church. She directs programs for St. James Episcopal Church in Wichita and is the treasurer of his mayoral campaign. The couple have three boys.

Elections

References

External links

 Brandon Whipple campaign official website

|-

1982 births
Living people
21st-century American politicians
American Episcopalians
Educators from Kansas
Candidates in the 2010 United States elections
Converts to Anglicanism from Roman Catholicism
Mayors of Wichita, Kansas
Democratic Party members of the Kansas House of Representatives
People from Rochester, New Hampshire
Politicians from Wichita, Kansas
Wichita State University alumni
Wichita State University faculty